{{Infobox album
| name         = The Rolling Stones
| type         = studio
| artist       = the Rolling Stones
| cover        = RS64.jpg
| border       = yes
| caption      = UK edition
| alt          = 
| released     = 
| recorded     = 3 January – 25 February 1964
| studio       = Regent Sound, London
| genre        = 
Blues rock
British R&B
| length       = 33:24
| label        = Decca
| producer     = 
Eric Easton
Andrew Loog Oldham
| prev_title   = 
| chronology   = The Rolling Stones UK
| prev_year    = 
| next_title   = The Rolling Stones No. 2
| next_year    = 1965
| misc       = 

{{Singles
 | name        = England's Newest Hit Makers  | type        = studio
 | single1     = Not Fade Away" / "I Wanna Be Your Man
 | single1date = 6 March 1964
 | single2     = Tell Me" / "I Just Want to Make Love to You
 | single2date = 13 June 1964
}}
}}The Rolling Stones is the debut studio album by the English rock band of the same name, released by Decca Records in the UK on 16 April 1964. The American edition of the LP, with a slightly different track list, came out on London Records on 30 May 1964, subtitled England's Newest Hit Makers, which later became its official title.

 Recording 
Recorded at Regent Sound Studios in London over the course of five days in January and February 1964, The Rolling Stones was produced by then-managers Andrew Loog Oldham and Eric Easton. The album was originally released by Decca Records in the UK, while the US version appeared on the London Records label.

The majority of the tracks reflect the band's love for R&B. Mick Jagger and Keith Richards (whose professional name until 1978 omitted the "s" in his surname) were fledgling songwriters during early 1964, contributing only one original composition to the album: "Tell Me (You're Coming Back)". Two songs are credited to "Nanker Phelge" – a pseudonym the band used for group compositions from 1963 to 1965. Phil Spector and Gene Pitney both contributed to the recording sessions, and are referred to as "Uncle Phil and Uncle Gene" in the subtitle of the Phelge instrumental "Now I've Got a Witness".

 Release 
First pressings of the album, with matrix numbers ending in 1A, 2A, 1B, and 2B, have a 2:52 version of "Tell Me (You're Coming Back)", which was pressed from the wrong master tape. Subsequent pressings include the 4:06 version. Early labels and covers also have misprints with the fourth track on side 1 listed as "Mona", which was later changed to "I Need You Baby"", the subtitle of "Now I've Got a Witness" written "Like Uncle Gene and Uncle Phil", the word 'If' omitted from "You Can Make It If You Try", and 'Dozier' spelt 'Bozier'. "Route 66" is listed as "(Get Your Kicks On) Route 66" on some versions of the album, and some later versions of the album have "I Need You Baby" listed as "Mona (I Need You Baby)" and the subtitles of "Now I've Got a Witness" and "Tell Me (You're Coming Back)" removed entirely.

The album cover photo was taken by Nicholas Wright. The cover bears no title or identifying information other than the photo and the Decca logo – an "unheard of" design concept originated by manager Andrew Oldham.

Upon its release, The Rolling Stones became one of 1964's biggest sellers in the UK, staying at No. 1 for twelve weeks.

The original British version of the album was released on compact disc in 1984, but became out-of-print on CD for many years afterwards. In November 2010, it was made available as part of a limited edition vinyl box set titled The Rolling Stones 1964–1969, and by itself digitally at the same time. The original title was also re-instated as part of the Rolling Stones in Mono CD box set, released on 30 September 2016. The album was only released in mono in both the UK and US; no true stereo mix was ever made.

The US version of the album, originally self-titled but later officially called England's Newest Hit Makers, was the band's debut US album and was released by London Records on 30 May 1964, a month and a half after the British version. The track "Not Fade Away" (the A-side of the band's third UK single) replaced "I Need You Baby", and the titles of the tracks "Now I've Got a Witness (Like Uncle Phil and Uncle Gene)" and "Tell Me (You're Coming Back)" were shortened to "Now I've Got a Witness" and "Tell Me" on most versions of the American release. Upon its release, The Rolling Stones reached No. 11 in the US, going gold in the process. To date, this is the Stones' only American studio album that has failed to place in the top five on the Billboard album charts. In August 2002, the album, by now officially called England's Newest Hit Makers, was reissued as a new remastered CD and SACD Digipak by ABKCO.

 Critical reception 
The album was included in Robert Dimery's 1001 Albums You Must Hear Before You Die (2010). Sean Egan of BBC Music wrote of the record in 2012: "It's a testament to the group's brilliance that the result was still the best album to emerge from the early 1960s British blues boom … the ensemble lovingly deliver some of their favourite shots of rhythm 'n' blues." It was voted number 418 in Colin Larkin's All Time Top 1000 Albums''.

Track listing

UK edition

US edition

Personnel 
According to authors Philippe Margotin and Jean-Michel Guesdon, except where noted:

The Rolling Stones
Mick Jagger vocals, handclaps, tambourine; harmonica , maracas 
Keith Richards backing vocals, lead and rhythm (6- and 12-string) guitars
Brian Jones backing vocals, rhythm guitar; lead guitar ; slide guitar ; harmonica ; tambourine ; whistling 
Bill Wyman backing vocals, bass, handclaps
Charlie Watts drums, handclaps
Unidentified musician (played by the Rolling Stones) tambourine 

Additional musicians
Allan Clarke backing vocals 
Graham Nash backing vocals 
Gene Pitney piano 
Phil Spector percussion, maracas 
Ian Stewart organ ; piano 

Production and additional personnel
Andrew Loog Oldham producer
Bill Farleyengineer
Nicholas Wright photography

Charts

Certifications

References

Sources

External links 
 

1964 debut albums
ABKCO Records albums
Albums produced by Andrew Loog Oldham
Decca Records albums
London Records albums
The Rolling Stones albums